Alfred E. Reinhardt (December 1902 - March, 1987) AIA, was an American architect active in mid-twentieth-century Connecticut and Massachusetts. His firm specialized in ecclesiastical design and was very active with Roman Catholic Clients, mostly in Connecticut.

Early life and architectural training

Reinardt was born in 1902 in New York City. He received his architectural training at Cooper Union (2 years), Mechanics Institute (1 year), Columbia University (night course, 2 years),  New York Building School (1 year), and Metropolitan Art School (1. Year).
He was apprentice for 5 years in the office of Donn Barber and then became a designer for Wilfred E. Anthony. He then worked for McKenna and Irving as head designer for 2.5 years. He served for 1 year as the director of architecture for the Metropolitan Museum of Art, and as an ecclesiastical designer for the Rambusch Decorating Company.

Architectural practice

Eventually he formed his own company located in Glastonbury, Connecticut. In 1958 his firm was relocated to Springfield Massachusetts where he was associated with the firm of  Munson, Mallis and Reinhardt. He served as president of the Western Chapter  of the AIA. In 1961 his business returned to Connecticut. He was granted Member Emeritus standing with the AIA in 1968.
 
Many of Reinhardt’s churches were of a round design,  rather unusual for the period.

Works Include
 St. Anthony Church, Plantsville, Connecticut
 Holy Spirit Church, Newington, Connecticut
 Mary, Queen of Peace Church, Plantsville, Connecticut
 St. Augustine Church, North Branford, Connecticut
 St. George Church, Guilford, Connecticut
 St. Thomas Aquinas Church, University of Connecticut, Storrs, Connecticut

References

Architects of Roman Catholic churches
American ecclesiastical architects
1902 births
1987 deaths
20th-century American architects
Architects from New York City
People from Glastonbury, Connecticut